Ferdinando Taverna (1558 – 29 August 1619) was an Italian Roman Catholic cardinal.

Biography

Born in Milan into a patrician family, Taverna studied canon and civil law in his hometown, obtaining doctorate and the title of magister. Later he went to Rome and became referendary of the Tribunals of the Apostolic Signature in 1588. He was named governor of several Papal towns: Viterbo, (1591), (Città di Castello, 1595–1596) and Fermo (vice-governor in 1595–1596). He became Governor of Rome on 30 April 1599, a title which he held until 1604. In that period he built Villa Parisi.

Taverna was created cardinal priest in the Consistory of 9 June 1604 by Pope Clement VIII, with the title of Sant'Eusebio and participated in the papal conclaves in 1605.

Pope Paul V made him  Bishop of Novara in 1615. Taverna died at Novara in 1619 and was buried at the Novara Cathedral.

References

External links
The Cardinals of the Holy Roman Church-Biographical Dictionary
Catholic Hierarchy data for Ferdinado Taverna
The story of Villa Parisi  

1558 births
1619 deaths
Clergy from Milan
17th-century Italian jurists
Bishops of Novara
17th-century Italian cardinals